Joni Haverinen (born May 17, 1987) is a Finnish professional ice hockey defenceman who currently plays for HPK of the SM-liiga.

References

External links

1987 births
Living people
People from Uusikaupunki
Finnish ice hockey defencemen
HPK players
Podhale Nowy Targ players
Sportspeople from Southwest Finland
21st-century Finnish people